The Ylioppilaskunnan Soittajat ("YS", the Helsinki University Symphony Orchestra) is a symphony orchestra resident in Helsinki, Finland.

YS was founded in 1926. It is a full-sized symphony orchestra, and performs concerts and tours both at home in Finland and abroad and takes part in various academic festivities.

History
The Ylioppilaskunnan Soittajat can trace its roots back to the year 1747, when the Akateeminen Kapelli (the Academic Capella) was founded at the Turku Academy.
After the great fire of Turku in 1827, the university moved to Helsinki, taking the orchestra with it.
From 1868 until 1926, the orchestra was run as a department of the University of Helsinki, under the name of Akadeeminen Orkesteri (the Academic Orchestra). In 1926, the Academic Orchestra gained its independence and became the Ylioppilaskunnan Soittajat.

Conductors
A number of world-famous Finnish conductors started their careers as principal or assistant conductor of the Ylioppilaskunnan Soittajat, including Paavo Berglund, Okko Kamu and Susanna Mälkki.

Principal conductors of Ylioppilaskunnan Soittajat

References

External links
Ylioppilaskunnan Soittajat website 
YS website 

1926 establishments in Finland
Musical groups established in 1926
Finnish orchestras
Music in Helsinki
University orchestras
University of Helsinki